The epic laws of folk narrative were a series of principles identified by Axel Olrik for understanding the structure and form of folktales, and have a foundational significance in European folklore studies.

Olrik's formulation of his 'epic laws' was inspired by an idea of Moltke Moe, but whereas Moe sought to derive rules for the historical development of narratives, Olrik's approach focuses on the structure of oral narrative. The principles were articulated in various publications, the first prominent one appearing in Danish in 1908. In the same year, Olrik presented the principles in German at an interdisciplinary congress in Berlin.

Olrik's thought on 'epic laws' was part of a wider project, developed with Kristian Erslev, for understanding oral narrative (which Olrik called sagn in Danish), also including principles for the study of sources and a theory of transmission. Although Olrik drew on non-European material, his focus was explicitly on European folk narrative.

Summary of the laws 
This summary is based on the numbering of the 1908 Danish article, and the English terminology is as far as possible from the 1965 English translation of the 1909 German article.

Key publications

 'Episke love i folkedigtningen', Danske Studier, 5 (1908): 69–89.
 ‘Epische Gesetze der Volksdichtung’, Zeitschrift für deutsches Altertum und Deutsche Literatur, 51 (1909), 1–12, translated into English by Jeanne P. Steager as ‘Epic Laws of Folk Narrative’, in The Study of Folklore, ed. by Alan Dundes (Englewood Cliffs, N.J.: Prentice-Hall, 1965), pp. 129–41, .
 Nogle grundsætninger for sagnforskning. Efter forfatterens død udgivet af Dansk folkemindesamling, ed. by Hans Ellekilde (Copenhagen: Det Schønbergske forlag, 1921), translated into English as Principles for Oral Narrative Research, trans. by Kirsten Wolf and Jody Jensen (Bloomington: Indiana University Press, 1992), .

References

1908 introductions
 
Folklore
Folklore studies
Narrative techniques

Traditional stories